Lawrence Wosskow (born 5 July 1963) is a British serial entrepreneur, who previously owned a number of UK companies, including Little Chef, a chain of 230 roadside restaurants; Out of Town Restaurants Group, the UK's largest shopping center caterer, Free Spirit, a chain of surf/outdoor retail stores; and the ice cream brands Loseley and Bradwells.

After retiring in 2006 due to ill health, Wosskow took a break from business. In 2009, he began investing in UK commercial properties, including redeveloping Harrogate’s town centre.

Based in the Bahamas, Wosskow has built stakes in a number of tech businesses around the globe.

Wosskow's book, Little Chef, the Heart of the Deal, was released on 28 November 2017.

References

External links 
 Little Chef, the Heart of the Deal website

British chief executives
Leaders of organizations
1963 births
Living people